Maltotriose is a trisaccharide (three-part sugar) consisting of three glucose molecules linked with α-1,4 glycosidic bonds.

It is most commonly produced by the digestive enzyme alpha-amylase (a common enzyme in human saliva) on amylose in starch.  The creation of both maltotriose and maltose during this process is due to the random manner in which alpha amylase hydrolyses α-1,4 glycosidic bonds.

It is the shortest chain oligosaccharide that can be classified as maltodextrin.

References

Trisaccharides
Sugars